Wanda Dynowska (Umadevi) (30 June 1888 – 20 March 1971) Polish theosophist, writer, translator, publisher, social activist, promoter of intercultural exchanges between India and Poland, jogini, foundress of the Indian-Polish Library.

Biography
Born in Sankt-Petersburg (Russia) to a family of Polish nobility. Studied in Kraków and Lausanne. From 1919 she became an active promoter of theosophy in Poland. She was general secretary for Poland in Theosophical Society.

In 1935, Dynowska came to India and got involved in new Hindu religious movements (with Ramana Maharishi, and philosopher Jiddu Krishnamurti, among others). She also became a close collaborator of Mahatma Gandhi supporting Indian movements for independence.

In 1944, together with another Polish Hindu Maurice Frydman, she founded the Indian-Polish Library in Madras, which became for more than thirty years a major editorial body for Polish translations of main Hindu religious texts (e.g. Bhagavat Gita, Mahabharata, Ramayana) as well as for contemporary Indian poetry and literature.

Dynowska translated from Polish to English, Tamil, and Hindi most important works of Polish poets, and published these works in India. She was an exceptionally active promoter of Polish culture and history in India.

From 1960, she started helping Tibetan refugees in India. Living in their main centre in Dharmasala, Dynowska organized schools, education, and social infrastructure there. Additionally, she published Polish translations of Buddhist texts.

She died in Mysore, and according to her will, her burial had an inter-religious (Catholic-Buddhist-Hindu) character.

References

Bibliography
 Kazimierz Tokarski "O Wandzie Dynowskiej-Umadevi" 
 Tadeusz Margul "Wanda Dynowska- wielka ambasadorka kultury polskiej" 
 Ryszard Sawicki "Gdzie się Ganges toczy" 
 Ewa Dolińska "Świetlista Dusza” (Orzeł Biały-Na Antenie, październik 1981) 
 Gandhi, aszramy i Tybetańczycy. Wywiad z Wandą Dynowską, Tygodnik Powszechny 1969

External links
 Biography and photos  , accessed 2010.9.14

1888 births
1971 deaths
Polish Theosophists
Polish women writers
Polish translators
Polish Hindus
Indian independence activists
Converts to Hinduism
Women mystics
Polish emigrants to India
20th-century translators